The Four-Headed Dragon is the 69th title of the Hardy Boys Mystery Stories, written by Franklin W. Dixon.  It was published by Wanderer Books in 1981.

Plot summary
The Hardy boys track a criminal who plans to use an invention designed as a peaceful aid to the secret Four-Headed Dragon organization behind the Iron Curtain to harm the free world instead.

The Hardy Boys books
1981 American novels
1981 children's books